Juraj Ontko (born 23 December 1964 in Liptovský Mikuláš) is a Czechoslovak-Slovak slalom canoeist who competed at the international level from 1981 to 1998.

He won five medals at the ICF Canoe Slalom World Championships. A silver and a bronze for Czechoslovakia in the C1 team event (1983, 1987) and a gold (C1 team: 1997) and two bonzes for Slovakia (C1 team: 1995, C2 team: 1993). He also won a gold medal in the C1 team event at the 1998 European Championships.

Ontko competed for Czechoslovakia at the 1992 Summer Olympics in Barcelona, finishing eighth in the C1 event.

His partner in the C2 boat was Ladislav Čáni.

World Cup individual podiums

References

External links 
 
 
 
 

1964 births
Living people
Canoeists at the 1992 Summer Olympics
Czechoslovak male canoeists
Olympic canoeists of Czechoslovakia
Slovak male canoeists
Medalists at the ICF Canoe Slalom World Championships
Sportspeople from Liptovský Mikuláš